Penhalvean is a hamlet in the civil parish of Stithians in Cornwall, England, UK.

References

Hamlets in Cornwall